Thomas H. Ford (August 23, 1814 – February 29, 1868) was an American Republican politician who served as the third lieutenant governor of Ohio from 1856 to 1858.

Ford was born August 23, 1814 at Rockingham County, Virginia. He had little formal education and his occupation was a farmer. He studied law and was admitted to the bar. He moved to Mansfield, Ohio, and became an anti-slavery leader. After delivering a speech at Philadelphia espousing the Republican party, he was offered the nomination for lieutenant governor in 1855, and won election to a single term. In 1860, he was chosen Government Printer by the United States House of Representatives. He served in the Mexican War, and was Colonel of the 32nd Ohio Infantry, Ohio Volunteer Militia during the U.S. Civil War. Ford was arrested in 1862, and sent to Washington, D.C. for trial by a military commission. He was charged with having neglected his duty in the defense of Maryland Heights at the  Battle of Harpers Ferry, September, 1862. After trial, Ford was ordered dismissed from the service on November 8, 1862, by order of the War Department. He located in Washington, D.C., where he had a lucrative law practice, and where he died February 29, 1868.

He was buried in Mansfield Cemetery.

Notes

References

1814 births
1868 deaths
Lieutenant Governors of Ohio
Ohio Republicans
Ohio lawyers
American military personnel of the Mexican–American War
People of Ohio in the American Civil War
Politicians from Mansfield, Ohio
Union Army colonels
19th-century American politicians
19th-century American lawyers